The 83rd Texas Legislature began on January 8, 2013. All members of the House and Senate were elected in the general election held on November 6, 2012.

Party summary

Senate

House of Representatives

Officers

Senate
 Lieutenant Governor: David Dewhurst (R)
 President Pro Tempore: Leticia Van de Putte (D)

House of Representatives
 Speaker of the House: Joe Straus (R)
 Speaker Pro Tempore: Dennis Bonnen (R)

Members

Senate

House of Representatives

Notable legislation
Texas Senate Bill 5 was among the legislation passed by the eighty-third Texas Legislature and signed into law, signed by Governor Rick Perry on July 18, 2013.

References

External links 

83 Texas Legislature
2013 in Texas
2013 U.S. legislative sessions